Martin Chrien (born 8 September 1995) is a Slovak professional footballer who plays for MFK Ružomberok as a midfielder.

Club career
Born in Banská Bystrica, Chrien made his professional debut for the local hegemon, Dukla Banská Bystrica against Košice on 1 December 2012. On 14 May 2014, he signed a four-year contract with Czech club Viktoria Plzeň, joining the senior team at the start of the 2014–15 season. He was then loaned to Dynamo České Budějovice and Zbrojovka Brno in the Czech Republic, and Ružomberok in Slovakia, respectively.

On 29 June 2017, he moved to Portugal and signed a five-year contract with defending champions Benfica Lisbon. He made his debut on 20 August 2017, in a league fixture against Belenenses, in a 5–0 win, coming on in the 71st minute of the match. Later in autumn he was relegated to the B-team, playing 16 games in LigaPro.
During the winter transfer window he was initially linked with a loan to Croatian clubs Hajduk Split or Osijek, as he did not get sufficient play time at Benfica, but neither of the moves took place.

Chrien spent the 2018–19 season with Santa Clara, who returned to the top division after 15 years of wait. His position in the squad was contested, playing 18 of 34 league games and 1 cup fixture. He scored 1 goal in the season. During this campaign, he was first nominated into Slovakia's senior national team.

In January 2020, Chrien signed with Mezőkövesd as a free agent, following low play in Benfica in 2020.

International career
Chrien was first called up to the senior national team by Pavel Hapal, who coached him for the majority of his U-21 international career. Hapal cited strong physical play in midfield and improved play time at Santa Clara as the primary reasons for the nomination for the double UEFA Euro 2020 qualifying fixture against Hungary and Wales. Chrien however failed to make the appearance, not even making it to the match sheet of either of the fixtures.

Chrien made his senior debut for Slovakia on 7 June 2019 in a friendly match against Jordan, as a starter, and scored the second goal in a 5–1 victory.

International goals
 (Slovakia score listed first, score column indicates score after each Chrien goal)

Notes and references

External links

1995 births
Living people
Sportspeople from Banská Bystrica
Slovak footballers
Slovak expatriate footballers
Slovakia youth international footballers
Slovakia international footballers
Association football midfielders
FK Dukla Banská Bystrica players
FC Viktoria Plzeň players
SK Dynamo České Budějovice players
FC Zbrojovka Brno players
MFK Ružomberok players
S.L. Benfica footballers
S.L. Benfica B players
C.D. Santa Clara players
Mezőkövesdi SE footballers
FK Pohronie players
Slovak Super Liga players
Czech First League players
Primeira Liga players
Liga Portugal 2 players
Nemzeti Bajnokság I players
Slovak expatriate sportspeople in the Czech Republic
Slovak expatriate sportspeople in Portugal
Slovak expatriate sportspeople in Hungary
Expatriate footballers in the Czech Republic
Expatriate footballers in Portugal
Expatriate footballers in Hungary